Jean Stevenson (1881–1948) was a New Zealand community worker and administrator. She was born in Dunedin, New Zealand in 1881.

References

1881 births
1948 deaths
People from Dunedin